Dominika Wolski (born 4 May in Szczecin, Poland) is a Polish-born, Canadian-raised actress living between Vancouver and Los Angeles.

Biography
Born in Szczecin, Poland, Wolski emigrated to North America at the age of 7. Her parents came from both aristocratic and country lineage and from an early age, Dominika moved fluidly between worlds of opulence and the rustic environs of an orchard. She began acting and writing stories at the same time as a youngster and her work, both on and off screen, reflects a mixture of classical and rebellious influences, the aristocratic debutante and the country girl.

She is classically trained but is known as a supporting actress who, "takes risks and brings a refreshing energy", (Jason Bourque, director, Game Over). In her first five years of acting, she worked with recognizable names such as Jeremiah Chechick, Bobby Roth, Jessica Alba, Dominic Purcell, Mischa Barton, Roland Joffe, and Bruce Greenwood.  Her career primarily is kept alive from working with Jason Bourque who she has had a long time relationship with, who has directed her in the majority of her credits according to IMDB.   She has been interviewed on MTV Canada and, En Route on-flight magazine.

Wolski was notably awarded a CBC mini series out of 1400 applicants nationwide for a pilot she wrote and starred in. The final series "Under the Cover" would also feature both her talents as a writer and as an actress. The original pilot was shown on Much Music and acquired for distribution by Cineflix. Wolski's other writing accomplishments include a Leo-Award-winning music video concept in which she also played a pixie ("Walk the Talk" for Sean Hogan) and an award-winning Bravo!FACT for artist Wyckham Porteous: again, Wolski both wrote the concept and played a leading role in the story line. She has said many times of her work as a hyphenate, "It's not for every actor but since I have an English degree, it works. Plus, I can either sit here and lament at the lack of intriguing dynamic roles for girls or I can stop whining and do something about it."

Wolski's striking features are often compared to those of a young Uma Thurman, and her natural energy is likened to Cameron Diaz: the tall gamine's physique is deceiving to some degree since Wolski was part of a national volleyball recruit camp for the Olympic Games and enjoys a variety of sports, horse riding and film-related weapons use.

She plays classical piano and speaks Polish, French and English. Since switching to a serious pursuit of a film career in 2001, Wolski has guest starred on almost every series on the West Coast Vancouver film scene including Under the Cover which she wrote and starred in. Wolski travelled to Mozambique by invitation of director Ed Zwick to visit the set of "Blood Diamond": she was also a guest at the Los Angeles premiere in December. Wolski actively supports actors working for social and environmental change: she is a member of Hollywood Hill, drives a VW Beetle and hopes to help promote clean diamonds as an alternative for her fellow actresses for glamorous events. She is also a big fan of animal & dog causes - her childhood "brother" was a large German Shepherd/Wolf cross called "Nero".

In 2009, Wolski appeared in "You and I" directed by Roland Joffe and with Jason Statham in an Audi advertisement that debuted during Super Bowl XLIII and has been cast in Demian Lichtenstein's film "Relentless."

February 2010: Dominika guest starred on MTV's new series Warren the Ape as Ludmilla, a Russian Astrophysist, Glamour's April 2010 issue and reappeared in the new Froote Collection.

In 2011, after an unexpected enforced 12-month hiatus, Dominika returned as Sasha in "Seattle Superstorm" and as the lead role in American World Pictures' film "Dragon Wasps" due out March 2012. In 2012 Dominika also completed three new Syfy films and was named as ambassador for Drive Around the World, an organization taking a converted electric Hummer across the South Pole with Buzz Aldrin and Steve Wozniak. She is also the face of Azada couture by Italian actress Tara Haggiag.

Filmography

Films 
 2000: The Guardian
 2001: Ripper as Kissing Blonde/Grinding Girl
 2003: Game Over as Elaine Barker
 2010: Fetch as Magdalena Nowak
 2011: You and I as Russian Super Model
 2012: Dragon Wasps as Gina Humphries
 2012: Dracano as Brayden Adcox
 2012: Stonados as Vanessa
 2013: Sink Hole as Heather
 2016: Vanquisher as Miranda May

Shorts 
 2003: Art History as Stella Anderson

Television

Series 
 2001: The Chris Isaak Show (1: Episode: Wages of Fear)
 2001: Pasadena (1 Episode: Henry's Secret) as Candy
 2002: Jeremiah (1 Episode: City of Roses) as Chloe
 2002: Dark Angel (2 Episodes: Love Among the Runes, Exposure) as Priestess
 2003: John Doe (1 Episode: Shock to the System) as Bruised
 2004: Andromeda (2 Episodes: Fear Burns Down to Ashes, Machinery of the Mind) as Hada
 2006: Three Moons Over Milford (1 Episode: Wrestlemoonia)
 2008: jPod (3 Episodes: Emo-tion Capture, I Love Turtles, The Betty and Veronica Syndrome) as Ellen
 2010: Warren the Ape (1 Episode: Amends) as Ludmilla Laika

Films 
 2003: Maximum Surge as Elaine Barker
 2003: Under the Cover as Tabatha
 2004: Meltdown as Tamara
 2012: Seattle Superstorm as Sasha
 2015: The Wrong Girl as Hana
 2016: I Didn't Kill My Sister as Lois Summer

TV shorts 
 2002: Below the Belt

References

External links
 Official website
 

 https://web.archive.org/web/20160324100417/http://www.canada.com/vancouversun/news/westcoastlife/story.html?id=35b8c9b7-f38b-4fd4-a450-51d035b8e328
 http://www.timescolonist.com/entertainment/gotta+this+movie+Rosanna+Arquette+tells+UVic+fine+arts+grad+model+fashion+designer+actor/7488025/story.html
 
 http://www.ecorazzi.com/2008/01/07/dominika-wolski-is-new-the-face-of-eco-friendly-bling/

1975 births
Living people
Polish emigrants to Canada
Actors from Szczecin
21st-century Canadian actresses